Wu Gang (born 9 December 1962) is a Chinese actor. He is known for his roles in Red Firecracker, Green Firecracker (1994), and Iron Man (2009) for which he won both Golden Rooster Award for Best Actor and Shanghai Film Critics Award for Best Actor.

Filmography

Film

Television series

Awards and nominations

Notes and references 

1962 births
20th-century Chinese male actors
21st-century Chinese male actors
Chinese male film actors
Chinese male television actors
Chinese male stage actors
Male actors from Beijing
Living people